Benet Academy (often shortened to "Benet") is a co-educational, college-preparatory Benedictine high school in Lisle, Illinois, United States, overseen by the Diocese of Joliet. Since its founding in 1888, notable alumni have included Olympic athletes, professional American football players, winners of Grammy and Academy Awards, singer David Bickler from Survivor, and a former Illinois Attorney General.

An alumni directory compiled in 1937 reveals that older alumni have included members of the clergy, businessmen, physicians, educators, attorneys, musicians, and journalists. For the 2010–11 school year, 1,333 students were enrolled at Benet.

Most students come from Lisle, Downers Grove, and Naperville, but students expected to graduate in 2013 came from 65 different schools and 34 different municipalities in DuPage and surrounding counties.

Admission is competitive and primarily based on the High School Placement Test, a standardized test by Scholastic Testing Service, taken in January of applicants' eighth grade year (around age 13). The Chicago Sun-Times ranked Benet one of the top ten high schools in the Chicago area in 2003, and in 1999 Benet was one of two high schools in DuPage County, and 100 high schools nationwide, featured as an "Outstanding American High School" by U.S. News & World Report.

Formerly known as the all-boys St. Procopius College and Academy, the school began to offer a remedial course, or a course designed to bring underprepared students to competency, to only two students on March 2, 1887. Enrollment grew to 30 high school students by 1947. The academy began to operate independently from the college in 1957. The all-girls Sacred Heart Academy, founded in 1926, operated nearby. Due to dwindling enrollment and funding, St. Procopius Academy and Sacred Heart Academy merged in 1967 to form Benet Academy.

Alumni

Former students with a — in the "Graduated" column did not graduate from Benet Academy.

References

Roman Catholic Diocese of Joliet in Illinois
Lisle, Illinois
Education in DuPage County, Illinois
Lists of American people by school affiliation
Benet Academy